Ben York Jones (born February 11, 1984) is an American screenwriter and film actor best known for writing and co-starring in Like Crazy (2011) which won the Dramatic Grand Jury Prize at the 2011 Sundance Film Festival.

Early life and career
Though born on the east coast, Jones grew up in Orange County, California. He attended Woodbridge High School in Irvine, California and graduated with a BFA in Film Production from Chapman University in 2006.

In 2010, the feature film Douchebag premiered in Dramatic Competition at the Sundance Film Festival. Jones starred in and co-wrote the film, though he was given an associate producer credit in lieu of a writing credit. Following the film's premiere, Jones and long time friend Drake Doremus began conceiving Like Crazy. Both he and Doremus had been through similar long-distance relationships, which served to inform the film's plot.

Following Like Crazy, Jones co-wrote the film Breathe In which premiered at the 2013 Sundance Film Festival. In the summer of 2016, production wrapped on Jones' adapted screenplay entitled Ashes in the Snow. The film is based on Ruta Sepetys' New York Times Bestseller Between Shades of Gray. Jones changed the title to avoid any possible confusion with the vastly dissimilar Fifty Shades of Grey franchise.

In 2017, Jones wrote Newness, directed by Doremus, which had its world premiere at the Sundance Film Festival.

Filmography

References

External links 
 

1984 births
American male screenwriters
Living people
Film directors from California
Male actors from Orange County, California
People from Englewood, New Jersey
Male actors from New Jersey
Film directors from New Jersey
Screenwriters from California
Screenwriters from New Jersey